Mad Max Beyond Thunderdome is a 1985 Australian post-apocalyptic dystopian action film directed by George Miller and George Ogilvie and written by Miller and Terry Hayes. It stars Mel Gibson and Tina Turner in a story of a lone roving warrior who is exiled into the desert and there encounters an isolated child cargo cult centred on a crashed Boeing 747 and its deceased captain.

Preceded by Mad Max in 1979 and Mad Max 2 in 1981, the film is the third installment in the Mad Max franchise, and it is the third and last film to feature Gibson as Max Rockatansky. Miller revived the series in 2015 with the release of the fourth installment, Mad Max: Fury Road, which stars Tom Hardy in the title role.

Plot
In post-apocalyptic Australia, Max Rockatansky is crossing the desert in a motor vehicle pulled by camels. The airborne bandit Jedediah and his young son attack him and steal his vehicle, and Max follows Jedediah's trail to a trading post called Bartertown. Initially refused entry because he has nothing to trade, he impresses the local officials with his toughness, and the founder and ruler of the town, Aunty Entity, offers to resupply him if he completes a task.

Aunty explains that Bartertown's precious energy comes from a subterranean refinery, called Underworld, that turns pig feces into methane. The refinery is run by a resourceful dwarf called Master, who rides around on Blaster, his giant bodyguard. "Master Blaster" has begun to challenge Aunty for control of Bartertown, and she wants Max to kill Blaster so she can more easily subvert Master to her will. 

Max infiltrates Underworld to size up Master Blaster and befriends Pig Killer, a convict sentenced to work there for slaughtering a pig to feed his children. When Master Blaster learns his newly-acquired vehicle belonged to Max, he forces Max to disarm a booby-trap. In doing so, Max sets off his alarm and discovers that Blaster is hypersensitive to high-pitched noises.

Back on the surface, Aunty tells Max that, by law, conflicts in Bartertown are resolved by a fight to the death in a gladiatorial arena called Thunderdome. Max publicly accuses Master of stealing his vehicle, and a battle is scheduled against Blaster. The giant dominates until Max blows a bosun's whistle, which makes Blaster grab his head in pain. Max knocks Blaster's helmet off and prepares to kill him, but relents upon seeing that Blaster has an intellectual disability. Max reveals Aunty's plot and Master threatens to shut down the refinery, so Aunty has Blaster killed. She is then able to terrorize Master into keeping the refinery running.

For breaking a deal, Max is bound, placed on a horse, and sent into the Wasteland, his punishment determined by the spin of a wheel. When the horse collapses from exhaustion, Max frees himself and continues on foot until he also collapses.

Savannah Nix finds Max near death and hauls him back to her home, an oasis populated by a primitive tribe of children and teenagers. The children are descended from survivors of a crashed Boeing 747, some of whom left to seek help and never returned. They believe Max is the pilot, Captain Walker, come to fix the aeroplane and fly them to the fabled "Tomorrow-morrow Land". Max denies he is Walker and insists there is no longer any civilisation like that in their stories. Disillusioned, a group of children led by Savannah wants to attempt the journey to Bartertown, but Max stops them and has them tied up, saying everyone should go on living in the oasis.

During the night, the separatists escape. Max agrees to bring them back, taking a few children along, but both parties are in bad shape by the time he catches up. Out of supplies, Max is forced to lead the children back to Bartertown.

The combined group sneaks into Underworld and, with Pig Killer's help, frees Master and escapes in a modified truck down some train tracks, destroying the refinery and most of Bartertown in the process. Aunty orders her forces to pursue and retrieve Master, and Max and his group do their best to fight off the attackers. They come across Jedediah and his son, who Max coerces into providing a ride in their aeroplane. With the approach of Aunty's army shortening the runway, Max gets in his vehicle, which a child stole from one of Aunty's men, and crashes an opening so the plane can take off. Injured and alone, Max is spared by an impressed Aunty, who leaves to rebuild Bartertown.

Jedediah flies Master, Pig Killer, and the children to the ruins of Sydney. Years later, they have established a small community with other wanderers. While they attempt to rediscover the knowledge of the pre-apocalyptic world, each night Savannah recites the story of their journey and they light up the city as a beacon to lead Max, or anyone else still out there, home.

Cast

 Mel Gibson as "Mad" Max Rockatansky, a lone warrior who was an MFP (Main Force Patrol) officer before the collapse of society. Aided by his pet small monkey, he roves the desert Wasteland aimlessly, his existence entirely based around self-sufficient survival.
The Flying Jalopy
 Bruce Spence as Jedediah, the marauding pilot of a small plane, who trades stolen goods in Bartertown. Spence previously played "The Gyro Captain" in Mad Max 2, and said about his casting in this film: "They were well into the shoot when they offered me a part described as 'not the Gyro Captain but kind of like the Gyro Captain!' ... They said there's kind of a reflection of him and that they were having difficulty casting the role so they thought to themselves, 'Why not Bruce!'"
 Adam Cockburn as Jedediah Jnr., who often helps his father steal supplies and flies his father's aeroplane while Jedediah Snr. procures the goods.
The People of Bartertown
 Tina Turner as Aunty Entity, the ruthless, determined ruler of Bartertown. Aunty is a glamorous, Amazon-like figure who recognises the strength of character in Max and hopes to exploit his physical power to bring Master under her control. Despite her brutality and Bartertown's chaos, Aunty is an intelligent, cultured woman, who holds a hope of one day rebuilding society to its former glory. Regarding the character, Miller said: "We needed someone whose vitality and intelligence would make her control over Bartertown credible. She had to be a positive character rather than a conventional evil 'bad guy.' We had worked on the script with [Turner] in mind. But we had no idea if she'd be interested."
 Frank Thring as The Collector, who runs Bartertown's trade and exchange network.
 Angelo Rossitto as The Master, a diminutive former-engineer who used his technical expertise to build the methane extractor responsible for Bartertown's electricity. At some point, he began riding around on the shoulders of Blaster for protection, and he has grown power-crazed, frequently humiliating Aunty by forcing her to publicly state that "Master Blaster runs Bartertown." After Blaster is killed, Master becomes a far more subdued, humble character, and eventually escapes with the help of Max, Pig Killer, and the children.
 Paul Larsson as The Blaster, Master's enormous, silent bodyguard, who is revealed to have an intellectual disability. He keeps his face covered by a helmet and carries Master around on his shoulders. Max fights him in Thunderdome as part of Aunty's plot against Master.
 Angry Anderson as "Ironbar" Bassey, the head of Bartertown's security and Aunty's top Henchman, who comes to dislike Max progressively more as the film proceeds. He is a fierce warrior despite his short height, and his outfit includes a white mask on a pole strapped to his back, at about the level of the faces of the other male characters. After suffering much abuse and surviving several nearly-fatal encounters with the heroes, he is last seen giving the finger from the wreck of the brutal climactic crash.
 Robert Grubb as Pig Killer, a convict in Bartertown sentenced to shovel pig feces in the methane refinery for the crime of killing a pig to feed his children. He befriends Max when Max goes to Underworld to size up Blaster before their fight, and when Max and the children return to rescue Master, Pig Killer escapes with them.
 George Spartels as Blackfinger, the head mechanic in Underworld
 Edwin Hodgeman as Dr. Dealgood, Bartertown's flamboyant auctioneer and judge
 Bob Hornery as Waterseller, a man who tries to sell Max radioactive water
 Andrew Oh as Ton Ton Tattoo, Aunty's saxophone player
The Tribe Who Left
 Helen Buday as Savannah Nix, one of the oldest members of an isolated primitive tribe of child survivors of a plane crash (or the children of those survivors). She and Slake ensure the tribe remembers its oral tradition through "tells" (recitations of their mythical origin and salvation narrative). After Max denies he is the fabled Captain Walker, she leads a contingent of the tribe out into the Wasteland to try to reach Bartertown.
 Mark Spain as Mr. Skyfish, a child who flies a feathered kite and has matted hair that sticks out to the sides
 Mark Kounnas as Gekko, a child with an injured leg who wears a headset and carries a stick with a record attached to the end. In a deleted scene, Gekko dies in the desert before the group reaches Bartertown, which is why he is absent from the rest of the film.
 Rod Zuanic as Scrooloose, a mute teenager who paints his face white with black around the eyes
 Justine Clarke as Anna Goanna, the child who first tells Max that Savannah and the others have escaped into the Wasteland to try to make it to Bartertown
 Shane Tickner as Eddie, the smallest child who goes with Savannah. He carries around a koala plush toy.
 Toni Allaylis as "Cusha...the pregnant girl"
 James Wingrove as Tubba Tintye, the hunter sent with Max when he goes after Savannah and the others
 Adam Scougall as Finn McCoo, the child who is the first to hear Savannah when she initially returns with Max and later is swallowed by a sinkhole in the desert
The Tribe Who Stayed
 Tom Jennings as Slake M'Thirst, the leader of the child tribe

Production
Beyond Thunderdome was the first Mad Max film made without producer Byron Kennedy, who was killed in a helicopter crash in 1983 while scouting locations for the film. Director George Miller was hesitant to continue without his producing partner, saying later: "I was reluctant to go ahead. And then there was a sort of need to – let's do something just to get over the shock and grief of all of that." There is a title card at the end of film before the credits roll that reads: "...for Byron".

Miller co-directed the film with George Ogilvie, with whom he had worked on the 1983 television miniseries The Dismissal. About this decision, he said: "I had a lot on my plate. I asked my friend George Ogilvie, who was working on the mini-series, 'Could you come and help me?' But I don't remember the experience because I was doing it to just... You know, I was grieving." For the film, Miller and Ogilvie employed a group workshopping rehearsal technique that they had developed.

Exterior location filming took place primarily in the mining town of Coober Pedy, though the set for Bartertown was built at an old brickworks (the Brickpit) at Homebush Bay in Sydney's western suburbs, and the children's camp was in the Blue Mountains. According to cinematographer Dean Semler, "Mad Max Beyond Thunderdome proved far more challenging than The Road Warrior. We were dealing with more varied environments than before and it was essential that each of the worlds created for the film have a distinctly different look."

Music

The musical score for Beyond Thunderdome was composed by Maurice Jarre, replacing Brian May, who composed the music for the first two films in the series. The film also contains two songs performed by Tina Turner: "One of the Living", which plays over the opening titles, and "We Don't Need Another Hero (Thunderdome)", which plays over the end credits.

"We Don't Need Another Hero (Thunderdome)" reached #1 in Canada, #2 in the US, and #3 on the British single charts. "One of the Living" was rerecorded for single release, and it reached #15 in both Canada and the US, but only #55 in Britain. At the 28th Annual Grammy Awards, "One of the Living" won the award for Best Female Rock Vocal Performance.

A soundtrack album was released by Capitol Records in 1985. It included Turner's songs alongside an instrumental version of "We Don't Need Another Hero (Thunderdome)" on Side 1, and some of Jarre's music on Side 2. A double CD containing only Jarre's original music was issued in 2010 on Tadlow Music/Silva Screen Records.

Reception

Box office
Although the film's budget was larger than that of its predecessors, its box office yield was only moderate in comparison. It grossed A$4,272,802 at the Australian box office, less than what Mad Max made and less than half of what Mad Max 2 made.

In the United States and Canada, the film grossed $36 million, generating theatrical rentals of $18 million. Outside of the U.S. (including Australia), it earned a similar amount, giving it worldwide rentals of $36 million.

Critical response
Critical reaction to the film was generally positive, though reviewers disagreed over whether they considered the film to be the highest or lowest point of the Mad Max trilogy. Most of the negative criticism focused on the children in the second half of the film, whom many found too similar to the Lost Boys from the story of Peter Pan. Robert C. Cumbow of Slant Magazine identified "whole ideas, themes and characterizations" adopted from Riddley Walker, a 1980 post-apocalyptic novel by Russell Hoban. On the other hand, there was much praise for the scene in the Thunderdome, which Roger Ebert of the Chicago Sun-Times called "the first really original movie idea about how to stage a fight since we got the first karate movies" and "one of the great creative action scenes in the movies". Ebert awarded the film 4 stars out of 4 and later placed it on his list of the ten best films of 1985. Variety wrote that the film "opens strong" and has good acting from Gibson, Turner, and the children.

Some fans of the series have criticised the film for being "Hollywood-ized" and having a lighter tone than its predecessors.

On review aggregator website Rotten Tomatoes, the film holds an 81% approval rating based on 54 reviews, with an average score of 6.5/10; the website's "critics consensus" reads: "Beyond Thunderdome deepens the Mad Max character without sacrificing the amazing vehicle choreography and stunts that made the originals memorable".

Legacy

As with the previous installments of the Mad Max series, Beyond Thunderdome has influenced popular culture in numerous ways. Of particular note is the widespread use of the term "thunderdome" to describe a contest in which the loser suffers a great hardship.

American filmmaker Chris Weitz has cited the film as an influence.

References

External links

 
 
 

1985 films
1985 independent films
1980s road movies
1980s science fiction action films
Australian independent films
Australian science fiction action films
Australian sequel films
Mad Max films
Films about automobiles
Films about death games
Films set in deserts
Films shot in South Australia
Films shot in New South Wales
Kennedy Miller Mitchell films
Peak oil films
Dystopian films
Australian post-apocalyptic films
Warner Bros. films
Films scored by Maurice Jarre
Films directed by George Miller
Films produced by George Miller
Films set in Australia
Australian action adventure films
Films with screenplays by George Miller
1980s English-language films